Sastri Nagar is a village in the Nicobar district of Andaman and Nicobar Islands, India. It is located in the Great Nicobar tehsil, around 35 km from Campbell Bay.

The village comes under the administration of Laxmi Nagar panchayat.

Demographics 

According to the 2011 census of India, Sastri Nagar has 6 households. The effective literacy rate (i.e. the literacy rate of population excluding children aged 6 and below) is 92.86%.

References 

Villages in Great Nicobar tehsil
Memorials to Lal Bahadur Shastri